Fusariosis is an infection seen in people with low neutrophils, a type of white blood cell that fights infection. It is a significant opportunistic pathogen in people with blood cancer.

It is associated with infections with Fusarium species, such as Fusarium proliferatum.It is fatal in more than half of cases.

References

External links 

Mycosis-related cutaneous conditions